Richard Lovelace, 1st Baron Lovelace (1564 – 22 April 1634) of Hurley, Berkshire was an English politician who sat in the House of Commons at various times between 1601 and 1622. He was raised to the peerage as Baron Lovelace in 1627.

Lovelace was born the son of Richard Lovelace and his wife, Anne, the daughter of Richard Warde of Hurst, also in Berkshire. He was educated at Merton College, Oxford in 1584, knighted in 1599, and succeeded his father in 1602.

Lovelace became a soldier and commanded a force under the Lord Deputy in Ireland, after which he was knighted in Dublin by the Earl of Essex.  His association with the earl led to a brief period of imprisonment on charges of plotting against Queen Elizabeth I but he was released without charge.

He was elected to the Parliament of England to represent Berkshire in 1601, Abingdon in 1604, New Windsor in 1614 and Berkshire again in 1621.

He was selected High Sheriff of Berkshire for 1610-11 and for Oxfordshire for 1626-27. In 1627 he was created Baron Lovelace of Hurley by Charles I. Lovelace died in Hurley in 1634. 

He had married twice: firstly, Katherine, daughter of Sir George Gyll and widow of William Hyde of Denchworth in Berkshire (now Oxfordshire) (no children) and, secondly, Margaret, daughter and co-heir of a rich merchant, William Dodworth, with whom he had four sons and five daughters. The eldest son was his heir John Lovelace, 2nd Baron Lovelace and a daughter Elizabeth married the regicide Henry Marten.

His son Francis should not be confused with the person of the same name who became the second Governor of the New York colony but who was however the grandfather of the John Lovelace who was a later Governor.

References

1564 births
1634 deaths
People from Hurley, Berkshire
High Sheriffs of Berkshire
High Sheriffs of Oxfordshire
Alumni of Merton College, Oxford
16th-century English nobility
Members of the Parliament of England for Berkshire
English knights
1
Richard, Baron 1st
English MPs 1601
English MPs 1604–1611
English MPs 1614
English MPs 1621–1622